The New England Patriots Cheerleaders (NEPC) are the official cheerleading squad of the NFL's New England Patriots first formed in 1971. The cheerleaders also make appearances off the field and overseas with Patriots mascot Pat Patriot, and also has a Junior Patriots Cheerleaders, with girls of ages 7–17 being allowed to join. The New England Patriots Cheerleader also mentor the young girls by enriching their interests. The team also releases a swimsuit calendar yearly. The Patriots Cheerleaders' auditions take place at Gillette Stadium. In 2008, the squad went to China to train Chinese dancers for the 2008 Summer Olympics.

Notable people

Coach 

 Tracy Sormanti (1994–2020), founded the Junior Patriots Cheerleaders, created the "Boot Camp" team audition process, formed a partnership with Dana-Farber Cancer Institute, served in 10 Super Bowls

Members 
Camille Kostek (2013–2014), model who was on the cover of the Sports Illustrated Swimsuit Issue and partner of NFL tight end Rob Gronkowski. 
Leah Van Dale (2007–2009), WWE wrestler
Tracy Sormanti (1983–84, 1991–93), 1993 Pro Bowler, team's Cheerleading Director (1994–2020)
 Kristin Gauvin (2003–2004), Miss Massachusetts 2005
Alysha Castonguay (2006–2008), Miss Rhode Island Teen USA 2002, Miss Rhode Island USA 2009
 Kelsey Fournier (2009–2011), Miss Rhode Island 2012
Julia Scaparotti (2015–2016), Miss Massachusetts USA 2017
 Jessica Strohm (2015–2016), Miss New Hampshire USA 2016
Jonét Nichelle (2018–2019), Miss Rhode Island USA 2020
Lauren Marchetti (2010–2011), contestant on The Bachelor Season 17
Amber van Eeghen (2002–2005), daughter of Mark van Eeghen, and wife of Dan Koppen

Gallery

See also

References

External links
 New England Patriots Cheerleaders Official Website

1977 establishments in Massachusetts
National Football League cheerleading squads
New England Patriots
Performing groups established in 1977
History of women in Massachusetts